Greatest Hits live  is the sixth album and second live album by the rock band Starz. The album was released in 2004 and 15 years after Live in Action was released.

Track listing

Personnel
Band members
Michael Lee Smith - vocals
Richie Ranno - guitar
Brendan Harkin - guitar
Pieter "Pete" Sweval - bass
Joe X. Dubé - drums

References

External links
Official band website
Interview with Richie Ranno
Interview with Starz guitarist Richie Ranno

2004 live albums
Starz (band) albums